Tea Leaves in the Wind is a 1938 British drama film directed by Ward Wing and starring Nils Asther, Eve Shelley and Gibson Gowland. It was shot on location in Ceylon.

Cast
 Nils Asther as Tony Drake  
 Eve Shelley as Margot Hastings  
 Gibson Gowland as David Webster  
 Cyril Chadwick
 Needham Clarke 
 Robert Anthony
 Marjorie Preece

References

Bibliography
 Low, Rachael. Filmmaking in 1930s Britain. George Allen & Unwin, 1985.
 Wood, Linda. British Films, 1927-1939. British Film Institute, 1986.

External links

1938 films
British drama films
1938 drama films
Films shot in Sri Lanka
Quota quickies
British black-and-white films
1930s English-language films
1930s British films